Arystan Hockey Club (Arystan hokkeı klýby), commonly referred to as Arystan Temirtau, was a professional ice hockey team based in Temirtau, Kazakhstan. They were founded in 2010, and played in the Kazakhstan Hockey Championship until they declared bankruptcy in 2015.

Season-by-season record
Note: GP = Games played, W = Wins, L = Losses, T = Ties, OTW = Overtime/shootout wins, OTL = Overtime/shootout losses, Pts = Points, GF = Goals for, GA = Goals against

Achievements
Kazakhstan Hockey Cup:
Winners (1): 2011

External links
 Official website

Defunct ice hockey teams in Kazakhstan
Temirtau